Jean Grémillon (3 October 1901 – 25 November 1959) was a French film director.

Biography
After directing a number of documentaries during the 1920s, many now lost, Grémillon had his first substantial success with the dramatic feature Maldone in 1928. Over the next quarter-century, he directed twenty more feature films, of which he is best known for five made between 1937 and 1944: Gueule d'amour (1937), L'Étrange Monsieur Victor (1938), Remorques (1941), Lumière d'été (1943), and Le ciel est à vous (1944), all but the first starring Madeleine Renaud.

Grémillon rejected what he referred to as "mechanical naturalism" in favor of "the discovery of that subtlety which the human eye does not perceive directly but which must be shown by establishing the harmonies, the unknown relations, between objects and beings; it is a vivifying, inexhaustible source of images that strike our imaginations and enchant our hearts."

Selected films directed by Jean Grémillon
 Maldone (silent, 1928)
 Gardiens de phare (The Lighthouse Keepers, silent, 1929)
La Petite Lise (Little Lise, 1930)
Daïnah la métisse (1931)
Le Petit Babouin (1932)
Pour un sou d'amour (For One Cent's Worth of Love, 1932) 
Gonzague (aka L'Accordeur, 1933)
 La Dolorosa (Our Lady of Sorrows, 1934)
Valse royale (1935)
Pattes de mouches (1936)
¡Centinela, alerta! (1937)
Gueule d'amour (Lady Killer, 1937)
L'Étrange Monsieur Victor (The Strange Monsieur Victor, 1938)
Remorques (Stormy Waters, 1941) 
Lumière d'été (Summer Light, 1943)
 Le ciel est à vous (The Woman Who Dared, 1944)
Le 6 juin à l'aube (documentary, 1946)
Les Charmes de l'existence (The Charms of Life, 1949) 
Pattes blanches (White Paws, 1949) 
L'Étrange Madame X (The Strange Madame X, 1951) 
L'Amour d'une femme (The Love of a Woman, 1953)

Notes

References

Print
Sellier, Geneviève (1989). Jean Grémillon: Le cinéma est à vous. Paris: Méridiens Klincksieck. (Correct date of birth: p. 13.)

Online
Enchanted Realism: The Films of Jean Grémillon program guide to Facets Multimedia mini-retrospective ("Mechanical naturalism...the discovery.")

External links
 
Jean Grémillon filmography, bibliography of works on the director, brief essay by critic Dudley Andrew; part of the Film Reference website
Rediscovering the Films of Jean Grémillon  program for mini-retrospective with movie descriptions; part of the Harvard Film Archive website
"Resurrection of a Martyr" article by Chris Fujiwara, Boston Phoenix, November 22–29, 2001

1901 births
1959 deaths
People from Bayeux
French film directors